Robert Green Harmon (October 15, 1887 – November 27, 1961) was a Major League Baseball pitcher. He played nine seasons in the majors, between 1909 and 1918, for the St. Louis Cardinals and Pittsburgh Pirates.

External links

1887 births
1961 deaths
Major League Baseball pitchers
Pittsburgh Pirates players
St. Louis Cardinals players
Shreveport Pirates (baseball) players
People from Barton County, Missouri
Baseball players from Missouri